Pomploz Church was an Armenian church located near the village of Gulustan (Julfa District) of the Nakhchivan Autonomous Republic of Azerbaijan. The church was located on a hill near the banks of the Araxes river, approximately 300m northwest of the main caravanserai in Old Julfa.

History 
The church was founded in 12th or 13th century and was restored in the 15th or 16th century. The church was still standing monument in the 1980s.

Architecture 
Pomploz Church was a single-naved domed structure with a semi-circular apse and entrance in the west. There were Armenian inscriptions on its western and northern facades.

Destruction 
The church was still extant in the 1980s and it was destroyed at some point between 1997 and September 23, 2003, as documented by Caucasus Heritage Watch.

References 

Armenian churches in Azerbaijan
Ruins in Azerbaijan